The State Hydro-Meteorological Administration is the National Meteorological service of the Democratic People's Republic of Korea. The service started in 1961, joining the WMO in 1975.

History
Immediately after liberation, on July 10, 1946, it was founded as the Central Meteorological Organization, an organization under the Ministry of Agriculture and Forestry of the North Korean Provisional People's Committee. In September 1952, it was directly under the cabinet. It was transformed into a State Hydro-Meteorological Administration in March 1961. In May 1975, it became an official member of the World Meteorological Organization (WMO), joined the Intergovernmental Oceanography Committee in November 1978, the International Hydrology Program (IHP) in 1980, and the Antarctic Treaty in November 1987. It became an independent agency in 1995.

On 26 August 2020, Korean Central Television (KCTV) broadcast through the night, for the first time, to monitor the progress of Typhoon Bavi. This included live reports from the State Hydro-Meteorological Administration and outdoors.

Locations
The headquarters is in Mirae Scientists Street, Pyongyang.

References 

Governmental meteorological agencies in Asia
1961 establishments in North Korea
Science and technology in North Korea